St. Mary's Catholic Church of Nebraska City, Nebraska is the mother church of Lourdes Central Catholic Schools in Nebraska City. It is located at 218 North 6th Street in Nebraska City.

External links
St. Mary's Catholic Church

 

Churches in the Roman Catholic Diocese of Lincoln
Roman Catholic churches in Nebraska
Churches in Nebraska City, Nebraska